Cornell Salmonn John (born 1963) is a British actor who has appeared in various film and television productions since 1999. He is most renowned for his role as Trife's uncle, Curtis, in the films Kidulthood (2006), Adulthood (2008) and Brotherhood in addition to later starring in the BBC soap opera EastEnders as Sam James, during 2013. He is also known for having originated the role of Mufasa in the West End production of the musical The Lion King.

Career 
John made his screen debut in two episodes of the television series The Knock. Over the course of the next few years he appeared in television shows including Maisie Raine and Lenny Henry in Pieces, and also appeared in the films Rottweiler and Red Mercury.

However, his most establishing role as a film actor was as Curtis, Trevor's Uncle, in the 2006 film Kidulthood, a role which he reprised for the sequel to the film Adulthood (2008), the latter of which was directed by fellow actor Noel Clarke. He then reprised the role for a 3rd time in the sequel to Adulthood, Brotherhood in 2016. He also appeared as Glenstorm in the fantasy film The Chronicles of Narnia: Prince Caspian in 2008, and the same year he appeared playing the same character in a video game of the same name. He has also appeared in other video games including EyeToy: Play and Fable. He has appeared on soap opera Doctors on two occasions, the first in 2001 and the second in 2005. He has also appeared in another medical drama Holby City on two occasions, the first in 2002, before returning to appear in another episode of the series ten years on in 2012. He appeared in his third medical drama Casualty in 2010. He appeared as Didi Mputu in four episodes of Five Days (2010) and as Sid in three episodes of Inside Men (2012).

He appeared in an episode of Top Boy in 2011, while other film credits include Anuvahood (2011) and Jack the Giant Slayer (2013).

From 2011 until 2012, he played the role of Wensley Dale in the children's television show Rastamouse. He appeared in 31 episodes of the series in total.

In 2012, he made a one-off appearance in the BBC television series, Waterloo Road. He played the role of Lionel Tsibi, the uncle of regular character Lula Tsibi (Marlene Madenge).

In 2013, he was cast in the role Sam James in the long-running BBC soap opera EastEnders. His character is introduced as the estranged husband to established character Ava Hartman (Clare Perkins) and father to Dexter Hartman (Khali Best). He was cast in the role by executive producer Lorraine Newman, and made his first appearance on the show on 14 May 2013. He made his final appearance on 16 December 2013.

In 2018, John appeared as 'Arnold Guzman' in the film Fantastic Beasts: The Crimes of Grindelwald.

Filmography

References

External links 
 

1963 births
Living people
Black British male actors
British male film actors
British male soap opera actors
British male television actors
British male video game actors
British male voice actors